Action! is an album by Jamaican rocksteady and ska group Desmond Dekker & the Aces that they released in 1968. Singer-songwriter Desmond Dekker composed all of the tracks, which includes the song "007 (Shanty Town)".

Track listing
All songs written by Desmond Dekker.
"Mother Pepper" – 2:21
"Don't Blame Me" – 2:24
"You've Got Your Troubles" – 3:13
"Personal Possession" – 2:55
"Unity" – 2:21
"007 (Shanty Town)" – 2:38
"It Pays" – 3:00
"Young Generation" – 2:08
"Mother Long Tongue" – 2:09
"Sabotage" – 2:44
"Mother's Young Girl" – 2:56
"Keep a Cool Head" – 2:01

See also
1968 in music

References

1968 albums
Albums produced by Leslie Kong
Desmond Dekker albums